Communiqué is an album by Steve Lacy and Mal Waldron released on the Italian Soul Note label in 1997. It features duo performances of tunes written by Thelonious Monk, Charles Mingus, Miles Davis, Elmo Hope and originals by Lacy and Waldron.

Reception
The Allmusic review by Ken Dryden awarded the album 4 stars, stating: "Like all collaborations featuring Steve Lacy and Mal Waldron together, this Soul Note CD is highly recommended."

Track listing
 "Who Knows" (Monk) - 4:02
 "Peggy's Blue Skylight" (Mingus) - 6:53
 "Smooch" (Mingus, Davis) - 5:42
 "Blue Monk" (Monk) - 6:07
 "Roll On" (Hope) - 5:23
 "No More Tears" (Waldron) - 5:46
 "Esteem" (Lacy) - 6:09
 "Prayer" (Lacy) - 6:27
 "Fondest Recollections" (Waldron) - 8:34
 "Wickets" (Lacy) - 4:55
 "Communique" (Waldron, Lacy) - 3:56
Recorded at Mu Rec Studio, Milano, on March 8 and 9, 1994

Personnel
Steve Lacy – soprano saxophone
Mal Waldron – piano
Giovanni Bonandrini – producer
Maria Bonandrini – artwork
William S. Burroughs – paintings
Gennaro Carone – mastering
Paolo Falascone – engineer, mixing
Steve Holtje – liner notes

References 

1997 albums
Steve Lacy (saxophonist) albums
Black Saint/Soul Note albums
Collaborative albums